Denmark issued ten definitive airmail stamps between 1925 and 1934 in two distinct series.  The 1st series, commonly called The Plow and Airplane was first issued in June 1925.  These stamps were designed by Danish artist Axel Peder Jensen (1885–1972). The 2nd series was issued on June 9, 1934, and depicted an airplane over Copenhagen.  The second series remained in use until after World War II.

1925 Plow and Airplane series
The 1925 series comprises Denmark's 1st airmail stamps and their issue corresponded with the opening of Kastrup airport in Copenhagen and the carriage of regular airmails by Det Danske Luftfartselskab, the Danish national airline. The 1925 series was issued in denominations of 10, 15, 25, 50 øre and 1 krone.  All the values were reissued in the 1930s.

Design and production
The Plow and Airplane design was created by Danish artist Axel P. Jensen and the stamps were printed by typography by H. H. Thiele in panes of 30 stamps arranged in five rows of six.  During the design and printing process, essays, proofs and color proofs of the stamps were made to finalize the design.

Constant Plate Flaws
The 1925 series is known for several constant plate flaws that appear on the same stamp in each sheet consistently.  These plate flaws have descriptive names.

Usages

1934 Airplane over Copenhagen series
The 1934 series was issued in denominations of 10, 15, 20, 50 øre and 1 krone.  The issue was designed by Poul E. Johansen and engraved by Jons Britze.

Usages

See also
Postage stamps and postal history of Denmark

References

Denmark
Philately of Denmark